Suri Sadar subdivision is an administrative subdivision of Birbhum district in the state of West Bengal, India.

Overview
Starting in its northern parts with the Brahmani-Mayurakshi Basin, a sub-micro physiographic region occupying the area between the Brahmani in the north and the Mayurakshi in the south, Suri Sadar subdivision merges with the Suri-Bolpur Plain, another sub-micro physiographic region that covers the interfluves of the Mayurakshi and the Ajay. The plain area exhibits somewhat upland topography sloping from north-west to south-east. The western part of the subdivision forms the Bakreswar Uplands, an extension of the plateau region of Santhal Parganas. The undulating area rises to high ridges on the western boundary with Jharkhand.

Geography

Subdivisions
Birbhum district is divided into the following administrative subdivisions:

Administrative units
Suri Sadar subdivision has 9 police stations, 7 community development blocks, 7 panchayat samitis, 62 gram panchayats, 1092 mouzas, 952 inhabited villages, 3 municipalities and 4 census towns. The municipalities are: Suri, Sainthia and Dubrajpur. The census towns are: Karidhya, Kalipur, Ahmedpur and Rajnagar. The subdivision has its headquarters at Suri.

Police stations
Police stations in Suri Sadar subdivision have the following features and jurisdiction:

Blocks
Community development blocks in Suri Sadar subdivision are:

Gram panchayats
The subdivision contains 62 gram panchayats under 7 community development blocks:

 Suri I block consists of seven gram panchayats, viz. Alunda, Karidhya, Mallickpur, Tilpara, Bhurkuna, Khatanga and Nagari.
 Suri II block consists of six gram panchayats, viz. Abinashpur, Domdama, Koma, Banshanka, Kendua and Purandarpur.
 Sainthia block consists of 12 gram panchayats, viz. Ahmadpur, Banagram, Horisara, Panrui, Bhromorkol, Deriapur, Hatora, Sangra, Amarpur, Fulur, Mathpalsa and Sreenidhipur.
 Dubrajpur block consists of ten gram panchayats, viz. Balijuri, Hetampur, Loba, Sahapur, Chinpai, Jashpur, Paduma, Gohaliara, Laxmi-Narayanpur and Parulia.
 Khayrashol block consists of ten gram panchayats, viz. Babuijore, Kendgore, Nakrakonda, Rupuspur, Barrah, Khoyrasole, Panchra, Hazratpur, Lokepur and Parsundi.
 Rajnagar block consists of five gram panchayats, viz. Bhabanipur, Gangmuri-Joypur, Tantipara, Chandrapur and Rajnagar.
 Mahammad Bazar block consists of 12 gram panchayats, viz. Angargaria, Charicha, Hinglow, Puranagram, Bharkata, Deucha, Kapista, Rampur, Bhutura, Gonpur, Mahamadbazar and Sekedda.

Education
Birbhum district had a literacy rate of 70.68% as per the provisional figures of the census of India 2011. Rampurhat subdivision had a literacy rate of 69.12%, Suri Sadar subdivision 71.16% and Bolpur subdivision 72.71%.
  
Given in the table below (data in numbers) is a comprehensive picture of the education scenario in Birbhum district, with data for the year 2013-14:

The following institutions are located in Suri Sadar subdivision:
Suri Vidyasagar College was established at Suri in 1942.
Birbhum Mahavidyalaya was established at Suri in 1979
Birbhum Institute of Engineering & Technology, an AICTE approved engineering college, was established at Suri in 1999.
Krishna Chandra College was established at Hetampur in 1896.
Abhedananda Mahavidyalaya was established at Sainthia in 1965.
Rajnagar Mahavidyalaya was established at Rajnagar in 2009.
Sailajananda Falguni Smriti Mahavidyalaya was established at Khoyrasol in 1998.
Basantika Institute of Engineering and Technology (Polytechnic) at Gonpur offers diploma courses in engineering.

Healthcare
Medical facilities in Suri Sadar subdivision are as follows:

Hospitals: (Name, location, beds)

Birbhum District Hospital, Suri, 525 beds
Birbhum Jail Hospital, Suri, 72 beds
Birbhum Police Hospital, Suri, 20 beds
Niramoy TB Sanatorium, Giridanga (Dubrajpur), 300 beds
Massanjore Irrigation Hospital, Massanjore (Dumka), 2 beds
(Physically outside the subdivision but administratively under it)

State General Hospitals: (Name, location, beds)

Sainthia State General Hospital, College Road, Sainthia, 100 beds

Rural Hospitals: (Name, CD Block, location, beds) 

Mohammad Bazar Rural Hospital, Mohammad Bazar CD Block, PO Pattelnagar, 30 beds
Rajnagar Rural Hospital, Rajnagar CD Block, Rajnagar, 30 beds
Sultanpur Rural Hospital, Suri II CD Block, PO Abinashpur, 30 beds
Dubrajpur Rural Hospital, Dubrajpur CD Block, PO Hetampur Rajbati, 30 beds
Nakrakonda Rural Hospital, Khoyrasol CD Block, Nakrakonda, 30 beds

Block Primary Health Centres: (Name, CD Block, location, beds)

Barachaturi Block Primary Health Centre, Suri I CD Block, PO Khatanga, 15 beds

Primary Health Centres: (CD Block-wise)(CD Block, PHC location, beds)

Mohammad Bazar CD Block: Bharkata (10), Puranogram (6), Rampur (10), Sakeddah (PO Dighalgram) (6)
Rajnagar CD Block: Bhabanipur (6), Tantipara (10)
Suri I CD Block: Kachujore (PO Mhubuna) (10), Chakdaha (6)
uri II CD Block: Purandarpur (10), Patanda (PO Ikra) (6)
Sainthia CD Block: Amarpur (PO Gargaria) (10), Bharmarkole (PO Kachuihata) (10), Sangra (PO Chhotosangra) (10) Srinidhipur (PO Purbasiur) (6) and Iswarpur (PO Ahmedpur) (10)
Dubrajpur CD Block: Balijuri (10), Jashpur (PO Ghoratore) (6), Jatra (6), Bakreshwar (6)
Khoyrasol CD Block: Barrah (10), Panchra (PO Panchrahat) (6), Lokpur (6)

Electoral constituencies
Lok Sabha (parliamentary) and Vidhan Sabha (state assembly) constituencies in Suri Sadar subdivision were as follows:

References

Subdivisions of West Bengal
Subdivisions in Birbhum district
Birbhum district